Enrique Cedeño Martinez (born 24 April 1992), better known by his in-game name xPeke, is a retired professional League of Legends player. He was the founder and owner of Origen, which competed in the LEC, the top level of professional League of Legends in Europe. Martinez is best known for his spell with Fnatic, with whom he has won three League of Legends Championship Series Europe titles and the Season 1 World Championship.

Early life 
Enrique Cedeño Martinez was born on 24 April 1992 in Spain. His hometown is Molina de Segura in the southeastern Spanish autonomous community of Murcia.

Career 

Martinez first came to prominence in 2011 as a member of myRevenge, winning the Intel Extreme Masters Season V League of Legends invitational.

Fnatic 
That myRevenge squad was picked up by Fnatic, with whom Martinez won the Season 1 League of Legends World Championship held at DreamHack. In 2013, he was a part of the Fnatic squad that played in the first ever split of League of Legends Championship Series Europe, eventually winning both the Spring and Summer Split, with him being named the Summer Split playoffs MVP. At IEM Season VI Katowice, Martinez "backdoored" SK Gaming in a play regarded as one of the most iconic in League of Legends history due to how he accomplished it under pressure, near death, and while the enemy team was about to destroy his own base. In 2014, he won another Spring Split title with Fnatic, but lost in the Summer Split finals to Alliance. After the Season 4 World Championship, Martinez announced his departure from Fnatic with the intention to create a new team. On 7 December 2014, the formation of Origen was officially announced, with Martinez assuming the position of a player manager. In its first season as a professional team, Origen won the Europe Challenger Series title and finished second in the Summer Split of the European LCS. Martinez and Origen qualified for the Season 5 World Championship, having qualified through the regional gauntlet. At Worlds they got to the semi-finals of the playoff bracket before losing to SK Telecom T1. Overall, Martinez had the highest Creep Score (CS) of any player in the tournament.

Origen 
Origen was initially founded by xPeke in December 2014 after he departed Fnatic to found his own team. Jungler Amazing (of Team SoloMid), support Mithy (formerly of Lemondogs), and rookie AD carry Niels (now called Zven) joined xPeke as he played mid lane. xPeke's former Fnatic teammate sOAZ joined shortly thereafter to play top lane. Origen established a base and gaming house in Tenerife in the Canary Islands of Spain in the beginnings.

In 2018 it was reported that Astralis' parent company RFRSH Entertainment had acquired Origen and would use their name and brand for their EU LCS entry as part of the 2019 European franchise program. On November 20, Riot Games confirmed Origen as one of the ten partner teams for the LEC 2019 Spring Split. xPeke stayed under the organization as an Origen ambassador and has an ownership.

Tournament placements

2011 
 1st IEM Season V LoL Invitational, 2011-03-04 (myRevenge)
 1st Riot Season 1 Championship, 2011-06-20 (Fnatic) 
 3rd IEM Season VI Global Challenge Cologne, 2011-08-21 (Fnatic) 
 1st IEM Season VI Global Challenge New York, 2011-10-16 (Fnatic)

2012 
 2nd SK Trophy March 2012-03-24 (Fnatic)
 1st RaidCall PLAY Cup 1, 2012-06-14 (Fnatic)
 2nd RaidCall PLAY Cup 2, 2012-05-31 (Fnatic)
 1st League of Champions, 2012-06-14 (Fnatic)
 1st IGN ProLeague Elites, 2012-07-03 (Fnatic)
 1st RaidCall Dominance 1, 2012-11-19 (Fnatic)
 1st DreamHack Winter 2012, 2012-11-23 (Fnatic)
 2nd IGN ProLeague Season 5, 2012-12-02 (Fnatic)
 IEM Season VII Global Challenge Cologne, 2012-12-16 (Fnatic)

2013 
 1st 2013 EU LCS Spring, 2013-04-28 (Fnatic)
 1st 2013 EU LCS Summer, 2013-08-25 (Fnatic)
 2nd IEM Season VIII Cologne, 2013-11-24 (Fnatic)

2014 
 2nd IEM Season VIII World Championship, 2014-03-16 (Fnatic)
 1st 2014 EU LCS Spring, 2014-04-17 (Fnatic)
 2nd 2014 EU LCS Summer, 2014-08-17 (Fnatic)

2015 
 1st 2015 EU Challenger Series Spring, 2015-04-08 (Origen)
 2nd 2015 EU LCS Summer, 2015-08-23 (Origen)
 Semifinalist 2015 League of Legends World Championship, (Origen)
 1st Intel Extreme Masters Season X - San Jose 2015-11-22, (Origen)

2016 
 2nd 2016 Spring EU LCS regular season (Origen)
 9th 2016 Summer EU LCS regular season (Origen)

Notes

References 

1992 births
Living people
Spanish esports players
Sportspeople from Murcia
Fnatic players
Origen (esports) players
League of Legends mid lane players